The men's hammer throw competition at the 2004 Summer Olympics in Athens was held at the Olympic Stadium on 20–22 August. There were 35 competitors from 24 nations. The event was marred by doping-related disqualifications, with the original first- and third-place athletes being removed. After those disqualifications, the event was won by Koji Murofushi of Japan, the nation's first medal in the event. No silver medal was awarded. Eşref Apak of Turkey received bronze, Turkey's first medal in the event as well.

Disqualifications

Adrián Annus of Hungary originally won the competition, but he was disqualified after being found guilty of tampering with his sample at the doping control. The original runner-up, Koji Murofushi, was accordingly declared the 2004 Olympic champion.

Originally, Ivan Tsikhan won the bronze medal. With Annus's disqualification, Tsikhan moved up to the silver medal. However, he was disqualified in 2012 after a retest of his samples from 2004 were positive for methandienone. Tsikhan withdrew from the 2012 Summer Olympics as a result. The decision was taken to vacate his medal, leaving the only medalists as Murofushi with gold and Eşref Apak of Turkey with the bronze. The athlete in a position to be elevated to the Olympic bronze medal, Vadim Devyatovskiy of Belarus, had previously been subject to a court case by the International Olympic Committee regarding doping at the 2008 Summer Olympics. The athlete in a position to be elevated to the Olympic silver medal, Eşref Apak of Turkey, received a 2-year doping ban in 2013 for the use of a prohibited substance, which lasted from 8 June 2013 to 25 June 2015.

Background

This was the 24th appearance of the event, which has been held at every Summer Olympics except 1896. Seven of the 12 finalists from the 2000 Games returned: gold medalist (and 1996 finalist) Szymon Ziółkowski of Poland, silver medalist Nicola Vizzoni of Italy, bronze medalist (and 1992 silver medalist and 1996 finalist) Igor Astapkovich of Belarus, fifth-place finisher (and 1996 finalist) Ilya Konovalov of Russia, eighth-place finisher Vladimír Maška of the Czech Republic, ninth-place finisher Koji Murofushi of Japan, and twelfth-place finisher Alexandros Papadimitriou of Greece. The last two World Champions were Ziółkowski (2001) and Ivan Tsikhan of Belarus (2003). Tikhon, 2002 European champion Adrián Annus of Hungary, and Murofushi (bronze medalist in the 2003 World Championship and who, in 2003, had the best throw of anyone since 1986—a mark that is still, in 2021, the fourth-best throw of all time) were the favorites.

Albania, Tajikistan, and Turkey each made their debut in the event. The United States appeared for the 23rd time, most of any nation, having missed only the boycotted 1980 Games.

Qualification

The qualification period for Athletics was 1 January 2003 to 9 August 2004. For the men's hammer throw, each National Olympic Committee was permitted to enter up to three athletes that had thrown 78.65 metres or further during the qualification period. The maximum number of athletes per nation had been set at 3 since the 1930 Olympic Congress. If an NOC had no athletes that qualified under that standard, one athlete that had thrown 74.35 metres or further could be entered.

Competition format

Each athlete received three throws in the qualifying round. All who achieved the qualifying distance of 78.00 metres progressed to the final. If fewer than twelve athletes achieved this mark, then the twelve furthest throwing athletes would reach the final. Each finalist was allowed three throws in last round, with the top eight athletes after that point being given three further attempts.

Records

, the existing world and Olympic records were as follows.

No new records were set during the competition.

Schedule

All times are Greece Standard Time (UTC+2)

Results

Qualifying

Rule: Qualifying standard 78.00 (Q) or at least best 12 qualified (q).

Final

References

External links
Official Olympic Report

Hammer throw men
2004
Men's events at the 2004 Summer Olympics